The 1210s was a decade of the Julian Calendar which began on January 1, 1210, and ended on December 31, 1219.

Significant people

References